Archbishop Christopher of Albania (secular name Sotir Kisi, ; 1881, Berat - 17 June 1958) was the primate of the Orthodox Autocephalous Church of Albania from 1937 to 1949. In 1959 he was found dead by poison.

Biography
Kisi was born in Berat in 1881. In 1937 he became the primate of the Orthodox Autocephalous Church of Albania as successor of Visarion Xhuvani, as authorized by the Patriarchate of Constantinople, which recognized the Holy Synod of the Church of Albania in April 1937. During World War II Kisi backed up the initiative of Italy and the Vatican (subsequently aborted) to unite the Orthodox Church with the Uniate Church. Kisi and the OACA high hierarchy, in contrast to the stand of many Orthodox clergy and laity, were supportive to the anti-Communist resistance movement after World War II and had previously welcomed the decision from German authorities of extending the jurisdiction of Albanian church to the Diocese of Prizren and newly created bishoprics of Peshkopia and Struga.

Kisi was found dead, as a result of poisoning, in 1958. His place as a primate was taken by Communist regime faithful, Pais Vodica.

References

20th-century Albanian clergy
20th-century Eastern Orthodox bishops
Albanian religious leaders
Eastern Orthodox Christians from Albania
Primates of the Albanian Orthodox Church
People from Berat
1881 births
1958 deaths
Deaths by poisoning